A pseudocereal or pseudograin is one of any non-grasses that are used in much the same way as cereals (true cereals are grasses). Pseudocereals can be further distinguished from other non-cereal staple crops (such as potatoes) by their being processed like a cereal: their seed can be ground into flour and otherwise used as a cereal. Prominent examples of pseudocereals include amaranth (love-lies-bleeding, red amaranth, Prince-of-Wales-feather), quinoa, and buckwheat.

Common pseudocereals 

 Acorn
 Amaranth (Love-lies-bleeding, Red amaranth,  Prince-of-Wales-feather)
 Breadnut
 Buckwheat
 Cañahua
 Chia
 Cockscomb (also called quail grass or soko)
 Pitseed goosefoot
 Quinoa
 Wattleseed (also called acacia seed)

Production
The following table shows the annual production of some pseudocereals in 1961, 2010, 2011, 2012, and 2013 ranked by 2013 production.

Other grains that are locally important, but are not included in FAO statistics, include:
 Amaranth, an ancient pseudocereal, formerly a staple crop of the Aztec Empire and now widely grown in Africa.
 Kañiwa or Cañahua, close relative of quinoa.

References